The Chenopodioideae are a subfamily of the flowering plant family Amaranthaceae in the APG III system, which is largely based on molecular phylogeny, but were included – together with other subfamilies – in the family Chenopodiaceae in the Cronquist system.

Food species comprise Spinach (Spinacia oleracea), Good King Henry (Blitum bonus-henricus), several Chenopodium species (Quinoa, Kañiwa, Fat Hen), Orache (Atriplex spp.), and Epazote (Dysphania ambrosioides). The name is Greek for goosefoot, the common name of a genus of plants having small greenish flowers.

Description 
The Chenopodioideae are annual or perennial herbs, subshrubs, shrub or small trees. The leaves are usually alternate and flat.

The flowers are often unisexual. Many species are monoecious or have mixed inflorescences of bisexual and unisexual flowers. Some species are dioecious, like Spinacia, Grayia, Exomis, and Atriplex. In several species of tribe Atripliceae, the female flowers are without perianth, but enclosed by two bracts. The species with a perianth have up to five tepals. The seed is horizontal or vertical, with annular or horseshoe-shaped embryo.

Distribution 
The subfamily Chenopodioideae is distributed worldwide, but originates from Eurasia.

Systematics 

The genera of this subfamily were formerly classified in family Chenopodiaceae in the Cronquist system.

According to Fuentes-Bazan et al. (2012) and based on molecular genetic research, the subfamily comprises four tribes and includes about twenty-six genera:
 Tribus Anserineae Dumort. (Syn. Spinacieae), with two genera: 
 Spinacia L.: with three species in Western Asia and North Africa:
 Spinach (Spinacia oleracea)
 Blitum, with 12 species nearly worldwide, for example: 
 Blitum capitatum – Strawberry Blite (Syn. Chenopodium capitatum) 
 Blitum bonus-henricus – Good King Henry (Syn. Chenopodium bonus-henricus) 
 Blitum virgatum – leafy goosefoot (Syn. Chenopodium foliosum)
 Tribus Atripliceae C. A. Mey. (Syn. Chenopodieae Dumort.): Fuentes-Bazan et al. (2012) include here also Chenopodium and related genera, as Chenopodiastrum, Lipandra and Oxybasis. 
Archiatriplex G.L.Chu, with only one species:
Archiatriplex nanpinensis G.L.Chu: endemic in the Chinese province Sichuan.
 Atriplex L. - saltbush, orache (Syn.: Blackiella, Cremnophyton, Haloxanthium, Neopreissia, Obione, Pachypharynx, Senniella, Theleophyton), with about 300 species worldwide
 Baolia H.W.Kung & G.L.Chu, with only one species:
 Baolia bracteata H.W.Kung & G.L.Chu, endemic in the Chinese province Gansu.
 Chenopodiastrum S. Fuentes, Uotila & Borsch: with five species, for example:
 Chenopodiastrum hybridum (L.) S. Fuentes, Uotila & Borsch (Syn. Chenopodium hybridum L.)
 Chenopodiastrum murale (L.) S. Fuentes, Uotila & Borsch – Sowbane, nettle-leaf goosefoot (Syn. Chenopodium murale L.)
 Chenopodiastrum simplex (Torrey) S.Fuentes, Uotila & Borsch – Maple-leaf goosefoot (Syn.: Chenopodium simplex (Torrey) Raf.) 
 Chenopodium L. – goosefoot (sensu stricto, incl. Einadia Raf. and Rhagodia R.Br.): with about 90 species worldwide. 
 Exomis Fenzl ex Moq., with only one species:
 Exomis microphylla (Thunb.) Aellen: a subshrub in southern and western Africa growing in gardens and hedges.
 Extriplex E.H.Zacharias, with two species in western North America:
 Extriplex californica (Moq.) E.H.Zacharias – California saltbush, California orache (Syn.: Atriplex californica Moq.)
 Extriplex joaquinana (A.Nelson) E.H.Zacharias – San Joaquin saltbush, San Joaquin orach (Syn.: Atriplex joaquinana A.Nelson)
 Grayia Hook. & Arn. – siltbush, hopsage (Syn. Zuckia Standl.), with four shrubby species in western North America, for example:
 Grayia spinosa (Hook.) Moq. – spiny hopsage
 Halimione Aellen – purslane, with three species in Europe and Western Asia, for example:
 Halimione portulacoides (L.) Aellen (Syn.: Atriplex portulacoides L.) – sea purslane
 Holmbergia Hicken, with only one species:
 Holmbergia tweedii (Moq.) Speg., a shrub in Bolivia, Paraguay and Argentina.
 Lipandra Moq.: with only one species:
 Lipandra polysperma (L.) S. Fuentes, Uotila & Borsch (Syn. Chenopodium polyspermum L.) – many-seed goosefoot
 Manochlamys Aellen, with only one species:
 Manochlamys albicans Aellen: a subshrub in southern Africa, Namibia and Cape province, growing on rocky and sandy slopes, sand dunes and road sides.
 Microgynoecium Hook.f., with only one species:
 Microgynoecium tibeticum Hook.f.: in Tibet and Sikkim, growing in alpine meadows and on disturbed sites.
 Micromonolepis Ulbr., with only one species:
 Micromonolepis pusilla (Torr. ex S. Watson) Ulbr. – small povertyweed, in western North America
 Oxybasis Kar. & Kir.: with five species, for example:
 Oxybasis chenopodioides (L.) S. Fuentes, Uotila & Borsch – low goosefoot (Syn. Chenopodium chenopodioides (L.) Aellen) 
 Oxybasis glauca (L.) S. Fuentes, Uotila & Borsch – Oak-leaved goosefoot (Syn. Chenopodium glaucum L.) 
 Oxybasis rubra (L.) S. Fuentes, Uotila & Borsch – Red Goosefoot (Syn. Chenopodium rubrum L.)
 Proatriplex (W.A.Weber) Stutz & G.L.Chu, with only one species:
 Proatriplex pleiantha (W.A.Weber) Stutz & G.L.Chu, an annual herb from western North America.
 Stutzia E.H.Zacharias (Syn. Endolepis Torr.), with two annual species in western North America:
 Stutzia covillei (Standl.) E.H.Zacharias (Syn. Atriplex covillei (Standl.) J. F. Macbr., Endolepis covillei Standl)
 Stutzia dioica (Nutt.) E.H.Zacharias (Syn. Atriplex suckleyi (Torrey) Rydberg, Endolepis suckleyi Torr.)
 Tribus Axyrideae (Heklau) G. Kadereit & A. Sukhor., with dendritic trichomes. three genera:
 Axyris L., with about six species Central Asia, Himalaya and western China, for example:
 Axyris amaranthoides L. – Russian pigweed, upright axyris
 Ceratocarpus L., with two species in Europe and West Asia
 Krascheninnikovia Gueldenst., with eight species in Eurasia and North America, for example:
 Krascheninnikovia lanata (Pursh) A.Meeuse & A.Smit – winterfat
 Tribus Dysphanieae:
 Cycloloma Moq. (Syn.: Cyclolepis Moquin-Tandon) with only one species:
 Cycloloma atriplicifolium (Sprengel) J.M.Coulter: widespread in Canada, USA and northern Mexico
 Dysphania R.Br., with about 42 species worldwide, for example:
 Dysphania ambrosioides – epazote
 Dysphania anthelmintica –  wormseed
 Suckleya A.Gray, with only one species:
 Suckleya suckleyana (Torr.) Rydb., a succulent annual from western North America.
 Teloxys Moq.: with only one species:
 Teloxys aristata (L.) Moq. (Syn.: Chenopodium aristatum L., Dysphania aristata): from Eastern Europe to temperate Asia, naturalized elsewhere.

Fossil record
The oldest fossil records for Chenopodioideae are pollen grains recovered from Maastrichtian sediments of the Edmonton Formation in Canada.

References
 Susy Fuentes-Bazan, Pertti Uotila, Thomas Borsch (2012): A novel phylogeny-based generic classification for Chenopodium sensu lato, and a tribal rearrangement of Chenopodioideae (Chenopodiaceae). In: Willdenowia. Vol. 42, No. 1, p. 5-24. 
 Gudrun Kadereit, Evgeny V. Mavrodiev, Elizabeth H. Zacharias & Alexander P. Sukhorukov: Molecular phylogeny of Atripliceae (Chenopodioideae, Chenopodiaceae) (2010): Implications for systematics, biogeography, flower and fruit evolution, and the origin of C4 Photosynthesis. - In: American Journal of Botany 97(10): p. 1664-1687. (chapters description, distribution and systematics)
 A.P. Sukhorukov, M. Zhang (2013): Fruit and seed Anatomy of Chenopodium and related genera (Chenopodioideae, Chenopodiaceae/Amaranthaceae): Implications for evolution and taxonomy. - PLOS ONE. Vol. 8, № 4. e61906. doi:10.1371/journal.pone.0061906 online

External links 
 

 
Caryophyllales subfamilies